The Academy Award for Best Visual Effects is an Academy Award given for the best achievement in visual effects.

History of the award
The Academy of Motion Picture Arts and Sciences first recognized the technical contributions of special effects to movies at its inaugural dinner in 1929, presenting a plaque for "Best Engineering Effects" to the first Best Picture Oscar winner, the World War I flying drama Wings.

Producer David O. Selznick, then production head at RKO Studios, petitioned the Academy Board of Governors to recognize the work of animator Willis O'Brien for his groundbreaking work on 1933's King Kong.

It was not until 1938 when a film was actually recognized for its effects work, when a "Special Achievement Award for Special Effects" was given to the Paramount film Spawn of the North. The following year, "Best Special Effects" became a recognized category, although on occasion the Academy has chosen to honor a single film outright rather than nominate two or more films. From 1939 to 1963, it was an award for a film's visual effects as well as audio effects, so it was often given to two persons, although some years only one or the other type of effect was recognized. In 1964, it was given only for visual effects, and the following year the name of the category was changed to "Best Special Visual Effects".

Honorees for this award have been bestowed several times as a Special Achievement Academy Award. In 1977, the category was given its current name "Best Visual Effects." For decades, shortlisted finalists were selected by a steering committee. They are presently chosen by the visual effects branch executive committee. 1990 was the last year there were no official nominees. Back to the Future Part III, Dick Tracy, Ghost and Total Recall advanced to a second stage of voting, but only Total Recall received a requisite average and it was given a special achievement Oscar.

To date, there have been three wholly animated films nominated in this category: The Nightmare Before Christmas in 1993, Kubo and the Two Strings in 2016, and The Lion King in 2019. There have been three semi-animated films nominated, which also won: Mary Poppins in 1964, Bedknobs and Broomsticks in 1971, and Who Framed Roger Rabbit in 1988.

Rules
Usually, there are three nominated films. In 1979, there were five films nominated. Sometimes, no award is given. Other times, a single film is given the award outright.

In 2007, it was decided that a list of no more than 15 eligible films would be chosen, from which a maximum of seven would be shortlisted for further consideration. A vote would then proceed, with a maximum of three nominees. Since 2010, there are ten shortlisted finalists which, using a form of range voting, produce five nominees. No more than four people may be nominated for a single film.

According to the official Academy Award rules, the criteria are:

(a) consideration of the contribution the visual effects make to the overall production and
(b) the artistry, skill and fidelity with which the visual illusions are achieved.

Filmmakers
A number of filmmakers have had their movies honored for their achievements in visual effects; i.e., six by director James Cameron (who began his career in Hollywood as an effects technician), five films produced by George Pal, five by director/producer George Lucas, four by directors Richard Fleischer, Steven Spielberg and Peter Jackson, three by directors Robert Zemeckis and Christopher Nolan, and two by directors Ridley Scott and Denis Villeneuve.

Stanley Kubrick's only Oscar win was in this category, for 1968's 2001: A Space Odyssey. The film's credits list four effects contributors, including Douglas Trumbull. However, according to the rules of the Academy in effect at the time, only three persons could be nominated for their work on a single film, which would have resulted in the omission of either Trumbull, Tom Howard, Con Pederson or Wally Veevers. Ultimately, it was Kubrick's name that was submitted as a nominee in this category, resulting in his winning the award, which many consider a slight to the four men whose work contributed to the film's success.

Engineering Effects Award
The table below display the Oscar nominees for Best Engineering Effects.

1920s

Special Effects Awards
The tables below display the Oscar nominees for Best Special Effects including the recipients of the Special Achievement Awards.

1930s

1940s

1950s

1960s

Visual Effects Awards
The tables below display the Oscar nominees for Best Visual Effects including the recipients of the Special Achievement Awards.

1960s

1970s

1980s

1990s

2000s

2010s

2020s

Shortlisted finalists
Finalists for Best Visual Effects are selected by the Visual Effects Branch Executive Committee. Beginning with a long list of up to 20 titles, the committee then advances ten films to the shortlist. Prior to the 83rd Academy Awards, only fifteen films were long-listed, and only seven films were shortlisted. The full membership of the Visual Effects Branch is invited to view excerpts and is provided with supporting information at a "bake-off" where balloting determines the five nominees. These are the additional films that presented at the bake-off.

Multiple awards

Multiple awards 

8 awards
 Dennis Muren

5 awards
 Gordon Jennings
 Joe Letteri
 Ken Ralston

4 awards
 L. B. Abbott
 Richard Edlund
 Glen Robinson

3 awards
 Randall William Cook
 Farciot Edouart
 John P. Fulton
 Alex Funke
 A. Arnold Gillespie
 Andrew Lockley
 Louis Mesenkop
 Carlo Rambaldi
 Jim Rygiel
 Bill Westenhofer
 Stan Winston
 Robert Legato
 Paul Lambert

2 awards
 Richard Baneham
 Neil Corbould
 John Dykstra
 Scott R. Fisher
 A. D. Flowers
 Paul Franklin
 Charles Gibson
 George Gibbs
 Allen Hall
 Thomas Howard
 Ian Hunter
 Brian Johnson
 Andrew R. Jones
 Eustace Lycett
 Robert MacDonald
 Tristan Myles
 Gerd Nefzer
 John Nelson
 Warren Newcombe
 Bruce Nicholson
 Guillaume Rocheron
 Stephen Rosenbaum
 Loren L. Ryder
 Fred Sersen
 Douglas Shearer
 Robert Skotak
 Kenneth F. Smith
 John Stears
 Richard Taylor
 Phil Tippett
 Albert Whitlock

Franchises

Multiple awards 

3 Wins
 Middle Earth
 Star Wars

 2 Wins
 Alien
 Avatar
 Indiana Jones
 King Kong

Multiple nominations 

13 Nominations
 MCU
10 Nominations
 Star Wars 
5 Nominations
 Middle Earth 
4 Nominations
 Alien

3 Nominations
 Batman
 Iron Man
 James Bond
 King Kong
 Pirates of the Caribbean 
 Planet of the Apes
 Spider-Man
 Star Trek
 Wizarding World

2 Nominations
 Avatar
 Blade Runner
 Guardians of the Galaxy
 Indiana Jones
 Jurassic Park
 Wizard of Oz
 Poltergeist
 Space Odyssey
 Superman
 Transformers

Superlatives
For this Academy Award category, the following superlatives emerge:

 Most awards: Dennis Muren  8 awards (resulting from 15 nominations)
 Most nominations: Dennis Muren  15 nominations (resulting in 8 awards)

See also 
 Saturn Award for Best Special Effects
 BAFTA Award for Best Special Visual Effects
 Critics' Choice Movie Award for Best Visual Effects

Notes

References

Visual Effects
 
Academy Award